Negribreen is glacier at Spitsbergen, Svalbard. The glacier debouches into Storfjorden, in Olav V Land and Sabine Land, and forms a wide glacier front with the moving extreme point Kapp Antinori. It is named after Italian geographer Christoforo Negri.

References

Glaciers of Spitsbergen